David Alejandro Oteo Rojas (born 27 July 1973) is a Mexican former professional footballer who last played for Rio Grande Valley Grandes in the USL Premier Development League in the United States.

A central defender capable of filling in at left fullback, Oteo began his career with UNAM in the 1992–93 season. He became a starter that season and remained a regular in the Pumas lineup until leaving for Tigres in 1999. By 2001 he had formed a solid partnership with former UNAM teammate Claudio Suárez in a defense that carried Tigres to the Invierno 2001 final, where they lost to Pachuca. In 2003 Tigres again reached the final before losing to Pachuca, with Oteo now receiving much of his playing time at left back after the emergence of Hugo Sánchez Guerrero to join Suárez in the center. He joined Toluca for one season in 2004, playing infrequently, then moved to Atlante in 2005. The Clausura 2007 season was Oteo's last in the Mexican top division.

Oteo also represented Mexico from 1996 to 2004. His international career began in the 1996 U.S. Cup against Bolivia in Dallas on June 8, 1996. He was named to the squad for the 2001 FIFA Confederations Cup by coach Enrique Meza, playing in Mexico's 2–0 loss to Australia. After a spell out of the team under Javier Aguirre, Oteo returned after the appointment of Ricardo Antonio Lavolpe and appeared in Mexico's 8-0 World Cup qualifying victory over Dominica in 2004, scoring his first and only international goal. Oteo's twelfth and last cap came at the 2004 Copa America, in a 2–2 draw against Uruguay on July 7, 2004.

Oteo was a member of Mexico's squad at the 1996 Summer Olympics, but did not appear in any of the team's four matches at the competition.

Career statistics

International goals

|-
| 1. || June 27, 2004 || Estadio Victoria, Aguascalientes, Mexico ||  || 6–0 || 8–0 || 2006 FIFA World Cup qualification
|}

References

External links

1973 births
Living people
Mexican footballers
Footballers at the 1996 Summer Olympics
2001 FIFA Confederations Cup players
2004 Copa América players
Olympic footballers of Mexico
Club Universidad Nacional footballers
Tigres UANL footballers
Deportivo Toluca F.C. players
Atlante F.C. footballers
Monterrey La Raza players
Guerreros de Hermosillo F.C. footballers
Rio Grande Valley Grandes players
Expatriate soccer players in the United States
Liga MX players
Ascenso MX players
USL League Two players
Association football defenders
Mexican expatriate sportspeople in the United States
Mexican expatriate footballers
1996 CONCACAF Gold Cup players
Mexico international footballers